E160 may refer to :
 An E number for carotenoids used as food coloring
 Huawei E160, a 3G modem stick
 Toyota Corolla (E160), a car